Zuhair Elia Mansour (born 7 June 1940) is an Iraqi weightlifter. He competed at the 1960 Summer Olympics, the 1964 Summer Olympics and the 1968 Summer Olympics.

References

1940 births
Living people
Iraqi male weightlifters
Olympic weightlifters of Iraq
Weightlifters at the 1960 Summer Olympics
Weightlifters at the 1964 Summer Olympics
Weightlifters at the 1968 Summer Olympics
Sportspeople from Baghdad
20th-century Iraqi people